Estevan Enrique "Steve" Bellán (October 1, 1849 – August 8, 1932) (his name also appears as Esteban in some records), was a Cuban-American professional baseball player who played as a third baseman for six seasons in the United States, three in the National Association of Base Ball Players (NABBP) from 1868 to , and three in the National Association of Professional Base Ball Players (NAPBBP) from  to . He is credited as the first Latin American born individual to play professional baseball in the USA.

The Havana-born Bellán studied at the Second Division of St. John's College in The Bronx, now known as Fordham Preparatory School, from 1863 to 1866, and the First Division of St. John's College, now known as Fordham University, from 1866 to 1868.  It was during his Fordham years that he acquired the English diminutive "Steve" that would follow him throughout his professional career in baseball.  

Arriving at Fordham, Estevan joined the Second Division baseball team, the Live Oaks, possibly having been exposed to the game back home in Cuba by American sailors who had played the game there during stopovers since the late 1850s. After completing his Second Division studies in 1866 and graduating from St. John's College in 1868, Bellán played one season for the Union of Morrisania, a member of the NABBP, and was part of their national championship team in 1868.

After leaving the Mutuals in 1873, he moved back to Cuba to play in their newly formed baseball leagues. His team, Club Habana, defeated Club Matanzas, 51–9 on December 27, 1874, in the first organized baseball game ever played in Cuba. He later became the club's player-manager, from 1878 to 1886, and led them to three Cuban League championships. He has been called "The Father of Cuban Baseball" for his role organizing the first Cuban baseball game, his success as a player and manager, and his continued influence on the game after his career had ended.

Early life
Born as Estevan Enrique Bellán on October 1, 1849 in Havana, Cuba to a wealthy Cuban father and an immigrant Irish woman. He was sent, along with his brother, to The Bronx in 1863 to study at St. John's College, known today as Fordham Preparatory School and Fordham University, which was common among Cuba's wealthy Catholic families. Having been exposed to the game in Cuba by American sailors, he soon joined the school's baseball teams: first, during his Fordham Prep years, the Second Division Live Oaks, and then, as a college student, Fordham Rose Hill Baseball Club.

After graduating in 1868, at the age of 18, he joined the Union of Morrisania, a member of the NABBP that was based The Bronx, today a part of New York City. He played in one season for the Unions, and helped them claim the national championship for the 1868 season.

Professional career
Nicknamed "The Cuban Sylph" for his elegant and stylistic play as a third baseman, Bellán joined the Troy Haymakers in 1869, while the team was member of the NABBP and still an amateur team. to 1872 for the Troy Haymakers. He played with the Haymakers through the 1869 and 1870 seasons when professionalism was officially permitted. The Haymakers then became a charter member of the NAPBBP in 1871, and Bellán played in all 29 of their games, 28 of them at third base, and one at shortstop. In 128 at bats, he collected 32 hits, hit three doubles, three triples, scored 26 runs, and had a .250 batting average. His nine bases on balls that season placed him eighth among the league leaders.

In 1872, Bellán played in 23 of the 25 games that the Haymakers games, while appearing at third base, shortstop, and in center field. He collected 30 hits, with four doubles, and had a .261 batting average. After the 1872 season, the Haymakers folded, and Bellán signed with the New York Mutuals for the 1873 season. He played eight games for the Mutuals, splitting his time at third and second base. His career statistics for his NAPBBP career include: a batting average of .252, 69 hits, 52 runs scored, 42 RBIs, nine doubles, three triples, and five stolen bases in 60 games.

Cuba
From 1878 to 1886 Bellán served as both player and manager for the recently founded Havana baseball team. His is recognized by many to be the true "father" of Cuban baseball for his role in organizing the first baseball game in Cuba on December 27, 1874. In that game, Club Habana defeated Club Matanzas, 51–9, in nine innings, with Bellán hitting three home runs. Bellán piloted Habana to three Cuban League baseball championships (1878–79, 1879–80, and 1882–83).

Estevan "Steve" Bellán died on August 8, 1932, at the age of 82, in Havana, Cuba. 

He was inducted by the Fordham University Hall of Fame, 1989-90 and is also a member of Fordham Prep's Hall of Honor.

See also 
List of Cubans
List of Major League Baseball players from Cuba

References
General

Specific

External links 

1849 births
1932 deaths
Fordham Preparatory School alumni
Fordham University alumni
Major League Baseball players from Cuba
Cuban expatriate baseball players in the United States
Major League Baseball third basemen
Morrisania Unions players
Troy Haymakers (NABBP) players
Troy Haymakers players
New York Mutuals players
19th-century baseball players
Baseball players from Havana